The Engan, or more precisely Enga – Southern Highland , languages are a small family of Papuan languages of the highlands of Papua New Guinea. The two branches of the family are rather distantly related, but were connected by Franklin and Voorhoeve (1973).

Name
The name "Engan" is often restricted to the northern branch of the family, to those languages transparently related to Enga, but also sometimes to the family as a whole.

Languages
The languages fall into three quite distinct branches: Engan proper, Huli, and Southern Highlands:
 North Engan (Engan proper): Enga–Kyaka–Lembena, Ipili, Bisorio (Nete, Iniai)
 South Engan (Kewa–Huli)
Huli
Southern Highlands: Angal (Mendi), Kewa; Samberigi (Sau)

Classification
The Engan family constitutes a branch of the Trans–New Guinea languages in the classification of Malcolm Ross, but the evidence for this is weak.

There are a considerable number of resemblances with Wiru. Borrowing has not been ruled out as the reason for this, though the pronouns are similar as well.

Proto-language

Phonemes
Usher (2020) reconstructs the consonant inventory as follows:

{| 
| *m || *n ||  ||  
|-
| *p || *t ||  || *k 
|-
| *mb || *nd ||  || *ŋg 
|-
| *w || *l || *j || 
|}

Vowels are *i *e *a *o *u.

Pronouns
Pronouns are easy to reconstruct for the northern and southern branches, but much more difficult for Engan as a whole.  Ross (2005) has the following for the singular, Wiru has been added for comparison:

{| 
! !!pEngan!!N Engan!!S Engan!!Wiru
|-
!1
|**nə||*na-ba||*ní||no (gen. anu)
|-
!2
|**ne-ke||*ne-ba||*ne-ke||ne (gen. ne-ke)
|-
!3
|?||*ba||*[n]i-bu||one
|}

Usher (2020) has not yet published reconstruction of Engan as a whole, but has done Engan proper:
{| 
|+Engan proper
! !!sg!!du!!pl
|-
!1
|*na(-mba)||*nali(-mba)||*nani(-ma)
|-
!2
|*ni(-mba) || ||
|-
!3
|*[e]-mba ||  ||
|}

Vocabulary
Some lexical reconstructions of Proto-Trans Enga (Proto-Engan) by Usher (2020) are:

{| class="wikitable sortable"
! gloss !! Proto-Trans-Enga !! Proto-Southern Highlands !! Huli
|-
! name
| *ŋge || *[i]mbi || mi-ni
|-
! fire/tree
| *ita || *ti || iɾa
|-
! moon
| *kana || *eke, *jumba || ege
|-
! four
| *tumenda || *mala || ma-
|-
! path
| *kaita || *pota || haɾiga
|-
! stand
| *kata || *ka || ha
|-
! cassowary
| *laima || *jati || jaɾi
|-
! skin
| *jan[o/u] || *joŋgale || doŋgo-ne
|}

Evolution
The Enga-Kewa-Huli reflexes of proto-Trans-New Guinea (pTNG) etyma, if Engan languages are indeed members of the Trans-New Guinea family, are:

Enga:
mona ‘heart’ < *mundun
yaka ‘bird’ < *
lyaŋa ‘ashes’ < *
ŋaŋa ‘baby < *ŋaŋ(a)
 ‘mother’ < *
kuri ‘bone’ < *kondaC
kare ‘ear’ < *
ne- ‘eat’ < *na
 ‘father’ < *apa
iti ‘hair’ < *
endo ‘fire’ < *
lema ‘louse’ < *niman
kana ‘moon’ < *
mana ‘instructions’ < *mana
kitama ‘morning’ < *
kumi- ‘die’ < *kumV-
re- ‘speak’ < *nde-
maa ‘taro’ < *mV
ita ‘tree’ < *inda

Huli:
ega ‘bird’ < *
na- ‘eat’ < *na-
aba ‘father’ < *apa
iri ‘hair’ < *
ira ‘tree’ < *inda
ma ‘taro’ < *mV

Kewa:
ama ‘mother’ < *
ibi ‘name’ < *imbi
iri ‘hair’ < *
uni ‘bone’ < *kwanjaC
apu ‘tail’ < *
lema ‘louse’ < *
oma ‘die’ < *kumV-
reka- ‘stand’ < *
la- ‘talk’ < *nde-
maa ‘taro’ < *mV
yaa ‘bird’ < *

Mendi:
am ‘mother’ < *
ap ‘father’ < *apa
mbi ‘name’ < *imbi
ome- ‘die’ < *kumV-

Vocabulary
Basic vocabulary of Enga and Kewa from William A. Foley (1986):

{| class="wikitable sortable"
! gloss !! Enga !! Kewa
|-
| ‘two’ || rama || laapo
|-
| ‘man’ || akari || ali
|-
| ‘water’ || ipa || ipa
|-
| ‘fire’ || ita || repona
|-
| ‘tree’ || ita || are
|-
| ‘leaf’ || yoko || yo
|-
| ‘root’ || pingi || pitaa
|-
| ‘house’ || ada || ada
|-
| ‘breast’ || adu || adu
|-
| ‘tooth’ || nege || agaa
|-
| ‘bone’ || kori || kuli
|-
| ‘ear’ || kare || kale
|-
| ‘hair’ || iti || iri
|-
| ‘leg’ || kape || aa
|-
| ‘blood’ || kupapu || kupaa
|-
| ‘hand’ || ruma || ki
|-
| ‘egg’ || kapa || yaa apaa
|-
| ‘sun’ || nita || nare
|-
| ‘axe’ || patama || rai
|-
| ‘netbag’ || nuu || nu
|-
| ‘eat’ || ne- || na-
|-
| ‘die’ || kumi- || koma-
|-
| ‘say’ || re- || la-
|-
| ‘give’ || mai-/gi- || gi-
|-
| ‘big’ || adake || adaa
|}

References

Further reading
Ross, Malcolm. 2014. Proto-Engan. TransNewGuinea.org.

External links 
 Timothy Usher, New Guinea World, Enga – Southern Highlands 
(ibid.) Trans-Enga

 
Languages of Papua New Guinea
Papuan languages
Language families
Northeast New Guinea languages